A list of films produced in France in 2008.

References

External links
 2008 in France
 2008 in French television
 French films of 2008 at the Internet Movie Database
French films of 2008 at Cinema-francais.fr

2008
Films
French